Stasia may be:
An informal name for the Caribbean island of Sint Eustatius
A diminutive for a Polish feminine first name Stanisława 
A diminutive for a Polish feminine first name Anastazja or for Russian/Belarusian/Ukrainian Anastasia.
"Ciocia Stasia" (Stanisława Dorobczyk-Bałucka) from Polish TV series Klan